Frantz Lender (12 April (24 April) 1881 - 14 September 1927) was a Russian and Soviet weapons designer.

References
 
 Rtc.ru
 History.gatchina.ru

1881 births
Weapon designers from the Soviet Union
1927 deaths
People from Dunaivtsi